Wszyscy kochają Romana (Everybody Loves Roman) is a Polish television sitcom that premiered on TVN on 2 September 2011. The series is a Polish-language adaptation of the American Emmy Awards winner, Everybody Loves Raymond and stars Bartłomiej Kasprzykowski as the titular Roman, a newspaper sportswriter.

The first four episodes were aired on Friday nights at 8:00 pm. On 30 September 2011 TVN announced the suspension of the series due to low ratings. Joanna Górska, TVN PR chief said that the network was looking for a new timeslot for the series. The last 11 episodes will be aired.

Cast and characters
Bartłomiej Kasprzykowski as Roman (Ray)
Aneta Todorczuk-Perchuć as Dorota (Debra)
Anna Seniuk as Maryla (Marie)
Joachim Lamża as Zygmunt (Frank)
Tede as Robert (Robert)

Episodes

References

External links
 
 Wszyscy kochają Romana at filmweb.pl

Polish television sitcoms
Polish television series based on American television series